Caesarea (Greek:  Kaisáreia), also known as Caesarea Maritima or Caesarea Palestinae, in medieval and early modern times known as  Qisarya, and in modern Israel as Keisaria (Hebrew: קיסריה), was an ancient and medieval city in the Sharon plain on the coast of the Eastern Mediterranean, and later a small fishing village. For centuries it was a major intellectual hub of the  Mediterranean and cultural capital of Palestine. Today the site is included in an Israeli national park.

The site was first settled in the 4th century BCE as a Phoenician colony and trading village known as Straton's Tower after the ruler of Sidon. It was enlarged in the 1st century BCE under Hasmonean rule, and in 63 BCE, when the Roman Republic annexed the region, it was declared an autonomous city. It was then significantly enlarged in the Roman period by the Judaean client king Herod I, who established a new harbour and dedicated the town and its port to Caesar Augustus as Caesarea. 

During the early Roman period, Caesarea became the seat of the Roman procurators in the region. It later became the provincial capital of the Roman province of Judaea, Roman Syria Palaestina and Byzantine Palaestina Prima provinces. The city was populated throughout the 1st to 6th centuries CE and became an important early centre of Christianity during the Byzantine period. Its importance may have waned starting during the Muslim conquest of 640 in the early Middle Ages. After being re-fortified by Muslim rulers in the 11th century, it was conquered by the Crusaders, who strengthened and made it into an important port, and was finally slighted by the Mamluks in 1265.

In the 1948 Palestine war its population fled ahead of or were expelled by the Zionist militant group Lehi and its houses demolished. The ruins of the ancient city beneath the depopulated village were excavated in the 1950s and 1960s for archaelogical purposes, and in 1977, the site was incorporated into the modern municipality of Caesarea, which lies 2 km to the north along the coast within Israel's Haifa District, as a tourist attraction.

Name
The Latin name Caesarea referred to a number of cities in the region, notably Caesarea near Mount Hermon and Caesarea the capital of Cappadocia. Whilst the name Caesarea was frequently used alone for the subject of this article, various markers were used to differentiate the location from these other locations; these include "Palestina" ("of Palestine"), "Maritima" ("by the sea"; Greek:  Parálios), "Sebaste" and "Stratonis". "Palestina" is the most common term used in ancient sources, but since the creation of Israel in 1948 historians have tended to use the term less frequently.

History

Antiquity
Stratonos pyrgos (Straton's Tower) was founded by Abdashtart I, or Straton I king of Sidon (r. 365-352 BC). It was first established as a Phoenician colony and trading village.

Hellenistic and early Roman periods

In 90 BCE, Jewish ruler Alexander Jannaeus captured Straton's Tower as part of his policy of developing the shipbuilding industry and enlarging the Hasmonean kingdom. Straton's Tower remained a Jewish settlement for two more generations, until the area became dominated by the Romans in 63 BCE, when they declared it an autonomous city.

Herodian city of Caesarea (22 BCE – 6CE)
Caesarea was built in Roman-ruled Judea under the Jewish client king Herod the Great during c. 22-10/9 BCE near the ruins of the small naval station of Straton's Tower.

The site, along with all of Judea, was awarded by Rome to Herod the Great in 30 BCE. The pagan city underwent vast changes under Herod, who renamed it Caesarea in honour of the Roman emperor, Caesar Augustus. Caesarea was known as the administrative, economic, and cultural capital of the Palestinian province from this time.

In 22 BCE, Herod began construction of a deep-sea harbour named Sebastos (see below) and built storerooms, markets, wide roads, baths, temples to Rome and Augustus, and imposing public buildings. Herod built his palace on a promontory jutting out into the sea, with a decorative pool surrounded by stoas.

Every five years, the city hosted major sports competitions, gladiator games, and theatrical productions in its theatre overlooking the Mediterranean Sea.

Construction of Sebastos harbour
King Herod built the two jetties of the harbour between 22 and 15 BCE, and in 10/9 BCE he dedicated the city and harbour to Emperor Augustus (sebastos is Greek for Augustus).

The pace of construction was impressive considering the project's size and complexity. At its height, Sebastos was one of the most impressive harbours of its time. It had been constructed on a coast that had no natural harbours and served as an important commercial harbour in antiquity, rivaling Cleopatra's harbour at Alexandria. Josephus wrote: "Although the location was generally unfavorable, [Herod] contended with the difficulties so well that the solidity of the construction could not be overcome by the sea, and its beauty seemed finished off without impediment."

When it was built in the 1st century BCE, the harbour of Sebastos ranked as the largest artificial harbour built in the open sea, enclosing around 100,000 m2.

The breakwaters were made of lime and pozzolana, a type of volcanic ash, set into an underwater concrete. Herod imported over 24,000 m3 of pozzolana from the name-giving town of Puteoli, today Pozzuoli in Italy, to construct the two breakwaters: the southern one 500 meter, and the northern one 275 meter long.

A shipment of this size would have required at least 44 shiploads of 400 tons each. Herod also had 12,000 m3 of local kurkar stone quarried to make rubble and 12,000 m3 of slaked lime mixed with the pozzolana.

Architects had to devise a way to lay the wooden forms for the placement of concrete underwater. One technique was to drive stakes into the ground to make a box and then fill it with pozzolana concrete bit by bit. However, this method required many divers to hammer the planks to the stakes underwater and large quantities of pozzolana were necessary.

Another technique was a double planking method used in the northern breakwater. On land, carpenters would construct a box with beams and frames on the inside and a watertight, double-planked wall on the outside. This double wall was built with a  gap between the inner and outer layer.

Although the box had no bottom, it was buoyant enough to float out to sea because of the watertight space between the inner and outer walls. Once it was floated into position, pozzolana was poured into the gap between the walls and the box would sink into place on the seafloor and be staked down in the corners. The flooded inside area was then filled by divers bit by bit with pozzolana-lime mortar and kurkar rubble until it rose above sea level.

On the southern breakwater, barge construction was used. The southern side of Sebastos was much more exposed than the northern side, requiring sturdier breakwaters. Instead of using the double planked method filled with rubble, the architects sank barges filled with layers of pozzolana concrete and lime sand mortar. The barges were similar to boxes without lids, and were constructed using mortise and tenon joints, the same technique used in ancient boats, to ensure they remained watertight. The barges were ballasted with 0.5 meters of pozzolana concrete and floated out to their position. With alternating layers, pozzolana-based and lime-based concretes were hand-placed inside the barge to sink it and fill it up to the surface.

However, there were underlying problems that led to its demise. Studies of the concrete cores of the moles have shown that the concrete was much weaker than similar pozzolana hydraulic concrete used in ancient Italian ports. For unknown reasons, the pozzolana mortar did not adhere as well to the kurkar rubble as it did to other rubble types used in Italian harbours. Small but numerous holes in some of the cores also indicate that the lime was of poor quality and stripped out of the mixture by strong waves before it could set.

Also, large lumps of lime were found in all five of the cores studied at Caesarea, which shows that the mixture was not mixed thoroughly. However, stability would not have been seriously affected if the harbour had not been constructed over a geological fault line that runs along the coast. Seismic action gradually took its toll on the breakwaters, causing them to tilt down and settle into the seabed. Studies of seabed deposits at Caesarea have shown that a tsunami struck the area sometime during the 1st or 2nd century.

Although it is unknown if this tsunami simply damaged or completely destroyed the harbour, it is known that by the 6th century the harbour was unusable and today the jetties lie more than 5 meters underwater.

Capital of Roman province

When Judea became a Roman province in 6 CE, Caesarea replaced Jerusalem as its civilian and military capital and became the official residence of its governors, such as the Roman procurator Antonius Felix, and prefect Pontius Pilatus.

In the third century, Jewish sages exempted the city from Jewish law, or Halakha, as, by this time, the majority of the inhabitants were non-Jewish. The city was chiefly a commercial centre relying on trade.

This city is the location of the 1961 discovery of the Pilate Stone, the only archaeological item that mentions the Roman prefect Pontius Pilate, by whose order Jesus was crucified. It is likely Pilate used it as a base, and only went to Jerusalem when needed.

The city was described in detail by the 1st-century Roman Jewish historian Flavius Josephus.

Josephus describes the harbour as being as large as the one at Piraeus, the major harbour of Athens. Remains of the principal buildings erected by Herod as well as the medieval town are still visible today, including the Crusader city, the city walls, the ruined citadel surrounded by the sea, and remains of the cathedral and a second church.

According to Josephus, Caesarea was the scene in 26 CE of a major act of civil disobedience to protest against Pilate's order to plant eagle standards on the Temple Mount of Jerusalem.

Emperor Vespasian raised its status to that of a Colonia, with the name Colonia Prima Flavia Augusta Caesarea.

According to Josephus, the outbreak of the Jewish revolt of 66 CE was provoked by Greeks of a certain merchant house in Caesarea sacrificing birds in front of a local synagogue.

In 70 CE, after the Jewish revolt was suppressed, games were held there to celebrate the victory of Titus. Many Jewish captives were brought to Caesarea; Kasher (1990) claims that 2,500 captives were "slaughtered in gladiatorial games".

In 6 CE Caesarea became the provincial capital of the Judaea Province, before the change of name to Syria Palaestina in 135, in the aftermath of the Bar Kokhba revolt. Caesarea was one of four Roman colonies for veteran Roman soldiers in the Syria-Phoenicia region.

Caesarea is mentioned in the 3rd-century Mosaic of Rehob, with respect to its non-Jewish population.

Early Christian centre

According to the Acts of the Apostles, Caesarea was first introduced to Christianity by Philip the Deacon, who later had a house there in which he gave hospitality to Paul the Apostle. It was there that Peter the Apostle came and baptized Cornelius the Centurion and his household, the first time Christian baptism was conferred on Gentiles. When newly converted Paul the Apostle was in danger in Jerusalem, the Christians there accompanied him to Caesarea and sent him off to his native Tarsus. He visited Caesarea between his second and third missionary journeys, and later, as mentioned, stayed several days there with Philip the Deacon. Later still, he was a prisoner there for two years before being sent to Rome.

In the 3rd century, Origen wrote his Hexapla and other exegetical and theological works while living in Caesarea. The Nicene Creed may have originated in Caesarea.

The Apostolic Constitutions says that the first Bishop of Caesarea was Zacchaeus the Publican, followed by Cornelius (possibly Cornelius the Centurion) and Theophilus (possibly the address of the Gospel of Luke).

The first bishops considered historically attested are those mentioned by the early church historian Eusebius of Caesarea, himself a bishop of the see in the 4th century. He speaks of a Theophilus who was bishop in the 10th year of Commodus (c. 189), of a Theoctistus (216–258), a short-lived Domnus and a Theotecnus, and an Agapius (?–306). Among the participants in the Synod of Ancyra in 314 was a bishop of Caesarea named Agricolaus, who may have been the immediate predecessor of Eusebius, who does not mention him, or who may have been bishop of a different Caesarea. The immediate successors of Eusebius were Acacius (340–366) and Gelasius of Caesarea (367–372, 380–395). The latter was ousted by the semi-Arian Euzoius between 373 and 379. Le Quien gives much information about all of these and about later bishops of Caesarea.

The Greek Orthodox Church of Jerusalem still has a metropolitan see in Caesarea, currently occupied by metropolitan Basilios Blatsos, since 1975.

The Latin archbishopric of Caesarea in Palestina was made a Roman Catholic titular see in 1432 (Zweder van Culemborg).

Melkite Catholic Church also consider Caesarea a titular see.

Theological library

Through Origen and especially the scholarly presbyter Pamphilus of Caesarea, an avid collector of books of Scripture, the theological school of Caesarea won a reputation for having the most extensive ecclesiastical library of the time, containing more than 30,000 manuscripts: Gregory Nazianzus, Basil the Great, Jerome and others came to study there. The Caesarean text-type is recognized by scholars as one of the earliest New Testament types. The collections of the library suffered during the persecutions under the Emperor Diocletian, but were repaired subsequently by bishops of Caesarea. The library was mentioned in 6th century manuscripts but it may not have survived the capture of Caesarea in 640.<ref>{{cite book|last=Swete|first=Henry Barclay|title=Introduction to the Old Testament in Greek, pp 74-75}}</ref>

Byzantine period
During the Byzantine period, Caesarea became the capital of the new province of Palaestina Prima in 390. As the capital of the province, Caesarea was also the metropolitan see, with ecclesiastical jurisdiction over Jerusalem, when rebuilt after the destruction in the year 70. In 451, however, the Council of Chalcedon established Jerusalem as a patriarchate, with Caesarea as the first of its three subordinate metropolitan sees.

Caesarea remained the provincial capital throughout the 5th and 6th centuries. It fell to Sassanid Persia in the Byzantine–Sasanian War of 602–628, in 614, and was re-conquered by Byzantium in 625.

Early Muslim period

Caesarea was lost for good by the Byzantines to the Muslim conquest in 640. Archaeological excavations discovered a destruction layer connected to the Muslim conquest of the city. Some newer research posits that there was no destruction caused by the Persians in 614 and Muslim Arabs in 640, but rather a gradual economic decline accompanied by the Christian aristocracy fleeing from the city.

According to Baladhuri, the fall of the city was allegedly the result of the betrayal of a certain Yusef, who conducted a party of troops of Muawiyah into the city. The city appears to have been partially destroyed upon its conquest. The 7th-century Coptic bishop John of Nikiû, claims there were "horrors committed in the city of Caesarea in Palestine", while the 9th-century Muslim historian Al-Baladhuri (d. 892) merely states that Kaisariyyah/Cæsarea was "reduced", mentioning it as one of ten towns in Jund Filastin (military district of Palestine) conquered by the Muslim Rashidun army under 'Amr ibn al-'As's leadership during the 630s.Al-Baladhuri, 1916, pp. 216-219

The former Palaestina Prima was now administered as Jund Filastin, with the capital first at Ludd and then at Ramla.

The city likely remained inhabited for some time under Arab rule, during the 7th and 8th century, albeit with much reduced population. Archaeological evidence shows a clear destruction layer identified with the conquest of 640, followed by some evidence of renewed settlement in the early Umayyad period. The area remained  well farmed from the Rashidun Caliphate period through to the Crusader conquest in the eleventh century. 

By the 11th century, it appears that the town had once again been developed into a fortified city. Writing in 1047, Nasir-i-Khusraw describes it as "a fine city, with running waters, and palm-gardens, and orange and citron trees. Its walls are strong, and it has an iron gate. There are fountains that gush out within the city". This is in agreement with William of Tyre's description of the Crusaders' siege in 1101, mentioning catapults and siege engines used against the city fortifications. Nasir-i-Khusraw noted a "beautiful Friday Mosque" in Caesarea in year 1047, "so situated that in its court you may sit and enjoy the view of all that is passing on the sea." This was converted into the church of St. Peter in Crusader times. A wall which may belong to this building has been identified in modern times.

Crusader/Ayyubid period

Caesarea was taken by Baldwin I in the wake of the First Crusade, in 1101. Baldwin sent a message to emir of Caesarea, demanding him to surrender the city or face a siege, but the Muslims refuse. On May 2, 1101, Baldwin began sieging the city with trebuchets. After fifteen days of resistance, the Crusader army broke through the defenses. Like in Jerusalem in 1099, the Crusaders proceeded to slaughter a portion of the male populace, enslave the women and children and loot the city. Baldwin spared the emir and qadi for a hefty ransom. Baldwin appointed a cleric veteran of the First Crusade, also named Baldwin, as the new Latin archbishop of Caesarea.

It was under Crusader control between 1101 and 1187 and again between 1191 and 1265.

William of Tyre (10.15) describes the use of catapults and siege towers, and states that the city was taken in an assault after fifteen days of siege and given over to looting and pillaging. Syriac Orthodox patriarch Michael the Syrian (born ca. 1126) records that the city was "devastated upon its capture".

William of Tyre mentions (10.16) the discovery of a "vessel of the most green colour, in the shape of a serving dish" (vas coloris viridissimi, in modum parapsidis formatum) which the Genuese thought to be made of emerald, and accepted as their share of the spoils. This refers to the hexagonal bowl known as the Sacro Catino in Italian, which was brought to Genoa by Guglielmo Embriaco and was later identified as the Holy Chalice.

Caesarea was incorporated as a lordship (dominion) within the Kingdom of Jerusalem, and the Latin See of Caesarea was established, with ten archbishops listed for the period 1101–1266 (treated as titular see from 1432–1967). Archbishop Heraclius attended the Third Lateran Council in 1179.

Saladin retook the city in 1187, but it was recaptured by the Europeans during the Third Crusade in 1191. In 1251, Louis IX of France fortified the city, ordering the construction of high walls (parts of which are still standing) and a deep moat.

The Arab geographer Yaqut, writing in the 1220s, named Kaisariyyah as one of the principal towns in Filastîn (Palestine).

In 1251, Louis IX fortified the city, ordering the construction of high walls (parts of which are still standing) and a deep moat.

The city was finally lost in 1265, when it fell to the Mamluk armies of Sultan Baibars, who ordered his troops to scale the walls in several places simultaneously, enabling them to penetrate the city. Baibars destroyed the fortified city completely to prevent its re-emergence as a Crusader stronghold, in line with the Mamluk practice in other formerly-Crusader coastal cities.

Mamluk period
During the Mamluk period, the ruins of ancient Caesarea and of the Crusader fortified town lay uninhabited.

Al-Dimashqi, writing around 1300, noted that Kaisariyyah belonged to the Kingdom of Ghazza (Gaza).

Ottoman period

Caesarea became part of the Ottoman Empire in 1516, along with the rest of the Levant, and remained under Ottoman rule for four centuries.

In 1664, a settlement is mentioned consisting of 100 Moroccan families, and 7–8 Jewish ones. In the 18th century it again declined.

In 1806, the German explorer Seetzen saw "Káisserérie" as a ruin occupied by some poor fishermen and their families.

In 1870, Victor Guérin visited.

Late Ottoman Qisarya
The village of Qisarya was allocated in 1880 to Bushnak (Bosniak) immigrants from Bosnia. The Bosniaks had emigrated to the area after Ottoman Bosnia was occupied by Austria-Hungary in 1878. According to Roy Marom,Fifty families of Bosnian refugees, mostly from Mostar, the main urban center of Bosnia and Herzegovina, settled among the ruins of Caesarea, renaming it with the Arabic name of Qisarya. Using the ancient masonry found on site, the settlers constructed a modern town with spacious accommodations and broad intersecting streets, according to traditional Bosnian town-plans. The town had two mosques, a Caravanserai, a Marketplace, a residence for the mudir, a harbor and Custom offices. Qisarya attracted high-ranking Bosnian functionaries who established estates near Qisarya. The town was declared the seat of a mudirieh (a minor administrative division).A population list from about 1887 showed that Caesarea had 670 inhabitants, in addition to 265 Muslim inhabitants, who were noted as "Bosniaks".

Petersen, visiting the place in 1992, noted that the nineteenth-century houses were built in blocks, generally one story high (with the exception of the house of the governor.) Some houses on the western side of the village, near the sea, have survived. There were a number of mosques in the village in the nineteenth century, but only one ("The Bosnian mosque") has survived. This mosque, located at the southern end of the city, next to the harbour, is described as a simple stone building with a red-tiled roof and a cylindrical minaret. In 1992 it was used as a restaurant and as a gift shop.

British Mandate of Palestine
In the 1922 census of Palestine, conducted by the British Mandate authorities, Caesarea had a population of 346; 288 Muslims, 32 Christians and 26 Jews, where the Christians were 6 Orthodox, 3 Syrian Orthodox, 3 Roman Catholics, 4 Melkites, 2 Syrian Catholics and 14 Maronite. The population had increased in the 1931 census to 706; 19 Christians, 4 Druse and 683 Muslims, in a total of 143 houses.

The Muslim village declined in economic importance and many of Qisarya's Muslim inhabitants left in the mid-1940s, when the British extended the Palestine Railways which bypassed the shallow-draft port. Qisarya had a population of 960 in 1945 statistics, with Qisarya's population composition 930 Muslims and 30 Christians in 1945.Department of Statistics, 1945, p.14 In 1944/45 a total of 18 dunums of Muslim village land was used for citrus and bananas, 1,020 dunums were used for cereals, while 108 dunums were irrigated or used for orchards,Government of Palestine, Department of Statistics. Village Statistics, April, 1945. Quoted in Hadawi, 1970, p. 91 while 111 dunams were built-up (urban) land.

1947–48 Civil War
The Civil War began on 30 November 1947. In December 1947 a village notable, Tawfiq Kadkuda, approached local Jews in an effort to establish a non-belligerency agreement. The 31 January 1948 Lehi attack on a bus leaving Qisarya, which killed two and injured six people, precipitated an evacuation of most of the population, who fled to nearby al-Tantura. The Haganah then occupied the village because the land was owned by the Palestine Jewish Colonization Association and, fearing that the British would force them to leave, decided to demolish the houses. This was done on 19–20 February, after the remaining residents were expelled and the houses were looted. According to Benny Morris, the expulsion of the population had more to do with illegal Jewish immigration than the ongoing civil war. In the same month the 'Arab al Sufsafi and Saidun Bedouin, who inhabited the dunes between Qisarya and Pardes left the area.

Palestinian historian Walid Khalidi described the village remains in 1992: "Most of the houses have been demolished. The site has been excavated in recent years, largely by Italian, American, and Israeli teams, and turned into a tourist area. Most of the few remaining houses are now restaurants, and the village mosque has been converted into a bar."

State of Israel
In 1952, a Jewish town of Caesarea was established near the ruins of the old city, which in 2011 were incorporated into the newly-created Caesarea National Park.

Archaeology and reconstruction
Large-scale archaeological excavations began in the 1950s and 1960s and continue to this day, conducted by volunteers working under the supervision of archaeologists. The majority of the archaeological excavations are done by the United States and Israel.

Remains from many periods have been uncovered, in particular from the large city of the Roman and Byzantine periods, and from the fortified town of the Crusaders. Major Classical-era findings are the Roman theatre; a temple dedicated to the goddess Roma and Emperor Augustus; a hippodrome rebuilt in the 2nd century as a more conventional theatre; the Tiberieum, where archaeologists found a reused limestone block with a dedicatory inscription mentioning Pilate- the only archaeological find bearing his name and title; a double aqueduct that brought water from springs at the foot of Mount Carmel; a boundary wall; and a 200 ft (60 m) wide moat protecting the harbour to the south and west.

In 1986, the Israel Exploration Society published the archaeological findings of L.I. Levine and E. Netzer, during three seasons of excavations (1975, 1976 and 1979) at Caesarea. In 2010, archaeological surveys-excavations of the site were conducted by Dani Vaynberger and Carmit Gur on behalf of the Israel Antiquities Authority (IAA), and others by Peter Gendelman and Jacob Sharvit on behalf of the IAA, Yosef Porath, Beverly Goodman, and Michal Artzy on behalf of University of Haifa. The site continued to be excavated as late as 2013. A new phase of exploration began in 2018 under the direction of Joseph L. Rife, Phillip Lieberman, and Peter Gendelman on behalf of Vanderbilt University and the IAA.

In February 2015, marine archaeologists and diving club members from the Israel Antiquities Authority announced that about 2,000 gold coins dating back more than 1,000 years have been discovered. According to the researchers, this could be a  large merchant ship trading with the coastal cities and ports in the Mediterranean and the coins could be for paying the salaries of the Fatimid military garrison. The remains are now the property of the state. In January 2021, researchers re-examined the coins discovered in 2015 and they retrieved hundreds more. The coins with Arabic text on both sides were 24 carat gold and 95 percent purity.

Roman and Byzantine administrative palace
A large compound, located in the archaeologists' Area CC, in the first insula of the Roman and Byzantine city south of the Crusader wall and close to the sea, along the decumanus, was in use as the Roman praetorium of the equestrian fiscal procurator, and then became the seat of the Byzantine governor. It contained a basilica with an apse, where magistrates would have sat, for the structure was used as a hall of justice, as fragments of inscriptions detailing the fees that court clerks might claim attest.

Roman mosaic (2nd–3rd c. CE)
A rare, colorful mosaic dating from the 2nd-3rd century CE was uncovered in 2018, in the Caesarea National Park near a Crusader bridge. It contains the image of three male figures wearing togas, geometric patterns, as well as a largely damaged inscription in Greek. It is one of the few extant examples of mosaics from that specific time period in Israel. The mosaic measures 3.5 × 8 meters and is, according to its excavators, "of a rare high quality" comparable to that of Israel's finest examples.

Hebrew priestly courses inscription (3rd–4th c. CE)
In 1962, a team of Israeli and American archaeologists discovered in the sand of Caesarea three small fragments of one Hebrew stone inscription bearing the partial names of places associated with the priestly courses (the rest of which had been reconstructed), dated to the third-fourth centuries. The uniqueness of this discovery is that it shows the places of residence in Galilee of the priestly courses, places presumably resettled by Jews after the First Jewish–Roman War under Hadrian. (Hebrew)Vardaman, E. Jerry and Garrett, J.L., The Teacher's Yoke, Waco TX 1964

Byzantine martyrion church
The main Byzantine church, an octagonal martyrion, was built in the 6th century and sited directly upon the podium that had supported Herod's temple, as was a widespread Christian practice. The martyrion was richly paved and surrounded by small radiating enclosures. Archaeologists have recovered some foliate capitals that included representations of the Cross. The site would in time be re-occupied, this time by a mosque.

6th-century gold glass mosaic table
In 2005 excavators found a well-preserved 6th-century panel covered in an exquisite mosaic made of glass gold and coloured opaque glass tesserae, used as a table, patterned with crosses and rosettes.Haaretz, picture of the glass mosaic panel, accessed 23 June 2019

Early-12th-century Muslim hoard
In 2018, a significant hoard of 24 gold coins and a gold earring was unearthed and tentatively dated to 1101.

UNESCO status
Since 2000 the site of Caesarea is included in the "Tentative List of World Heritage Places" of the UNESCO.

References

Joseph Patrich, "Caesarea in the Time of Eusebius" in S. Inowlocki, C. Zemagni (eds.), Reconsidering Eusebius: Collected papers on literary, historical, and theological issues'' (2011), 1–24.

External links

Jewish Encyclopedia: Cæsarea by the Sea
PBS Frontline – Caesarea
Archaeology of Caesarea
Photo gallery of Caesarea
Photo gallery of Caesarea
 Gavriel Solomon, Caesarea National Park: Conservation Maintenance, Israel Antiquities Authority Site - Conservation Department
Photos of Caesarea at the Manar al-Athar photo archive

Caesarea Maritima
Archaeological sites in Israel
Crusader castles
Disestablishments in the Kingdom of Jerusalem
Castles and fortifications of the Kingdom of Jerusalem
Castles in Israel
Establishments in the Herodian kingdom
Former populated places in Southwest Asia
Jews and Judaism in the Roman Empire
Maritime archaeology in Israel
National parks of Israel
New Testament cities
Populated places established in the 1st century BC
Populated places of the Byzantine Empire
Protected areas of Haifa District
Roman aqueducts outside Rome
Roman towns and cities in Israel
Talmud places
1100s establishments in the Kingdom of Jerusalem
Phoenician cities
World Heritage Tentative List
Caesarea Maritima